Thanga Manasukkaran is a 1992 Indian Tamil-language romantic drama film, directed by Rajavarman. The film stars Murali and Sivaranjani, with Goundamani and Senthil in supporting roles. It was released on 20 March 1992.

Plot

Murugesh, also known as Murugan, is a musician. He comes with his troupe into a village and is assigned to play from Aadi, the fourth month of the Tamil calendar, till the conclusion of the Village festival. The village head's daughter Chellakili waits for her lover Murugan, who was missing, while her cousin Duraipandi, a brute, wants to marry her. Chellakili is curious about a song from her childhood sung by Murugesh. Meanwhile, a guitarist in the same music band as Murugesh falls in love with a Karakattam dancer in the village, while Sundal, another guitarist, helps him.

Murugesh finally reveals to Chellakili that he is her long-lost lover and cousin Murugan and also discloses the reason behind his disappearance. In the past, Chellakili's father wanted his daughter to marry his nephew and orphan Murugan. However, Yasodai, Chellakili's aunt, wanted Chellakili to marry Duraipandi, her son. She managed to beat Murugan, and she expelled him from the village. Later, Murugan became a singer in a music band, and he still pines for Chellakili.

Duraipandi tries to kill Murugan through a crude bomb and fails. Over time, Duraipandi and Yasodai learn of Murugan's identity and romance. They then reveal Chellakili's love affair to her father without disclosing Murugesh's real identity. Her family then meets the Sadha Swamy, who causes Chellakili to forget her love through black magic. Now, Chellakili rejects Murugan's love and forgets him. What transpires later forms the crux of the story.

Cast

Murali as Murugesh (Murugan)
Sivaranjani as Chellakili
Vijayakumar as Chellakili's father
Goundamani as Guitarist in Murugan's troupe
Senthil as Sundal
G. M. Sundar as Duraipandi
C. R. Saraswathi as Yasodai
M. N. Nambiar as Sadha Swamy
S. N. Lakshmi as Chellakili's grandmother
Bayilvan Ranganathan as Mookkamma's father
Sharmili as Mookkamma
Kullamani
Ramesh Kumar
Ranjith
Sahadevan
Mahadevan

Soundtrack

The music was composed by Ilaiyaraaja, with lyrics written by Gangai Amaran, Kamakodiyan and Piraisoodan.

References

External links 

1990s Tamil-language films
1992 films
1992 romantic drama films
Films scored by Ilaiyaraaja
Indian romantic drama films